Scaptesyle thestias is a moth in the subfamily Arctiinae. It is found on Java.

References

Natural History Museum Lepidoptera generic names catalog

Lithosiini